Asi is a Turkish television drama series. The series originally aired from July 21, 2007, to June 15, 2009. It ran for two seasons on Kanal D.

Premise 
The series is set in a rural part of Antakya and revolves around the lives of Asi Kozcuoğlu (Tuba Büyüküstün), and Demir Doğan (Murat Yıldırım), and their respective families.

For three generations, the Kozcuoğlu family owns a prominent plantation in Antakya. Keeping this farm alive is their foremost goal. The owner, Ihsan Kozcuoğlu (Çetin Tekindor), and his daughter, Asi, work and live for their land. Years ago, Demir's mother, Emine (Elif Sümbül Sert), and aunt, Süheyla (Tülay Günal), were workers on the Kozcuoğlu farm until his mother drowned herself with her two kids Demir and Melek in the nearby river called Asi /Orontes (The modern name ‘Asi` means ("rebel"), because the river flows from the south to the north unlike the rest of the rivers in the region.). Her children survived, Demir and Melek, and they went on to live with their aunt Süheyla. Demir returns to his hometown as a rich businessman. Still embittered about the circumstances that drove his mother to her death, he meets Asi and is immediately drawn to her. However, the lives of the Kozcuoğlu family and Demir's family bear more connections from the past that constantly seem to get in between. Family secrets start unravel after Süheyla returns to be with her nephew Demir. Murder, death, affairs, and a love child is discovered as everyone's life is turned upside down when decade old secrets come to surface. Demir and Asi's love is tested to the limits as they struggle to hold to their affection while their world crumbles around them.goudy

Episodes

Cast
Main cast
Tuba Büyüküstün as Asiye "Asi" Kozcuoğlu
Murat Yıldırım as Demir Doğan
Çetin Tekindor as İhsan Kozcuoğlu
Nur Sürer as Neriman Kozcuoğlu
Cemal Hünal as Kerim Akbar
Selma Ergeç as Defne Kozcuoğlu

Supporting cast
Tülay Günal as Süheyla
Tülay Bursa as Fatma
Necmettin Çobanoğlu as Ökkeş
Saygın Soysal as Aslan Kozcuoğlu
İbrahim Bozgüney as Arif
Aslıhan Güner as Gonca Kozcuoğlu
Onur Saylak as Ziya
Elif Sönmez as Melek Doğan
Kenan Bal as Namık
Dilara Deviren / Zeynep Çopur as Ceylan Kozcuoğlu
Tuncel Kurtiz as Cemal Ağa
Ayça Zeynep Aydın as Leyla Akbar
Şahnaz Çakıralp as Sarmaşık
Setenay Yener as Sevinç
Kanbolat Görkem Arslan as Ali Uygur
Emrah Elçiboga as Zafer
Menderes Samancilar as Haydar Doğan
Sibel Kasapoğlu as Young Asi
İdil Vural as Young Süheyla
Çağla Çakar as Asya
Elif Sude Dorukoğlu as Elif
Eli Mango as Madam
Ezgi Çelik as İnci
Remzi Evren as Mahmut
Elvin Aydoğdu as Cevriye
Elif Sümbül Sert as Emine Doğan
Salahsun Hekimoğlu as Reha
Murat Çamur as Kaan
Birce Akalay as Zeynep

International broadcasting
  on Maestro TV as Asi
  on Express Entertainment as Asi
  on Kanal D as Asi
  on Kanal D as Asi
  on Horn Cable Television as Caasi
  on Prva as Asi
  on TV Sitel as Asi 
  on Kohavision as Asi
  on Nova TV as Asi
  on TV Doma as Perla Orientu
  on ANT1 as Asi
  on Kino Nova as Гордата Аси
  on MBC as "ASI"
  on MBC as "ASI"
  on Kanal D as "Asi — Împotriva destinului"
  on 2M as "ASI"
  on Yoshlar TV as "Osiyo"
  on 1+1 as "Asi"

References

External links
Official Website on Kanal D

Turkish drama television series
2007 Turkish television series debuts
2009 Turkish television series endings
2000s Turkish television series
Kanal D original programming
Turkish television series endings
Television shows set in Istanbul
Television series produced in Istanbul